Bolton Mountain is a mountain located in Chittenden County, Vermont. Bolton is flanked to the north by Mount Mayo.

Bolton Mountain stands within the watershed of Lake Champlain, which drains into Canada's Richelieu River, the Saint Lawrence River, and into the Gulf of Saint Lawrence. The northeast slopes of Bolton Mountain drain into Miller Brook, thence into the Little River, the Winooski River, and into Lake Champlain. The southeast slopes of Bolton Mountain drain into Cotton Brook, thence into the Little River. The south end of Bolton drains into Joiner Brook, thence into the Winooski River. The west slopes of Bolton drain into Mill Brook, thence into the Winooski River. The northwest slopes of Bolton drain into Lee River, thence into Browns River, the Lamoille River, and into Lake Champlain.

The Long Trail, a 272-mile (438-km) hiking trail running the length of Vermont, crosses the summit of Bolton Mountain.

See also 
 List of mountains in Vermont

References 

Mountains of Vermont
Landforms of Chittenden County, Vermont